Hissing Fauna, Are You the Destroyer? is the eighth album by American indie pop band of Montreal, released on January 7, 2007. The album was written, performed, and recorded by Kevin Barnes, with assistance from friends and family: prominent Elephant Six members Bryan Poole, Jamey Huggins and Heather McIntosh, as well as Barnes' wife Nina Grottland, credited as Nina Twin, and daughter Alabee Barnes, credited as Alabee Blonde. Credits also feature Georgie Fruit, a glam rock alter ego of Barnes.

Background
Barnes has described the album as a concept album, detailing their transformation from Kevin Barnes into Georgie Fruit. Georgie Fruit exists as Kevin Barnes' alter ego, which they will assume for the final half of the album, as well as the two subsequent LPs, Skeletal Lamping and False Priest. According to "Labyrinthian Pomp," Georgie Fruit is a "dark mutation for my demented past time." The transformation takes place during "The Past Is a Grotesque Animal," the 12-minute-long "turning point" of the album. In addition, the album namechecks many things commonly associated with glam rock, such as drugs, art and fashion; "The Past Is a Grotesque Animal" alludes to Edward Albee's play Who's Afraid of Virginia Woolf? and specifically mentions Georges Bataille's novella Story of the Eye.

Barnes credits their being prescribed antidepressants with the making of the album. "The real issue was a chemical thing, so when I finally got on medication, that balanced it out. So that helped me have a better perspective on things and helped my relationship with my wife and helped me through [the album]." "Heimdalsgate Like a Promethean Curse", the album's first single, chronicles their struggle with chemical imbalance and mood disorders.

Track listing
All songs written by Kevin Barnes. 
 "Suffer for Fashion" – 2:59
 "Sink the Seine" – 1:04
 "Cato as a Pun" – 3:02
 "Heimdalsgate Like a Promethean Curse" – 3:18
 "Gronlandic Edit" – 3:24
 "A Sentence of Sorts in Kongsvinger" – 4:54
 "The Past Is a Grotesque Animal" – 11:52
 "Bunny Ain't No Kind of Rider" – 3:51
 "Faberge Falls for Shuggie" – 4:31
 "Labyrinthian Pomp" – 3:21
 "She's a Rejecter" – 4:02
 "We Were Born the Mutants Again with Leafling" – 4:57

Bonus tracks on Australian edition
"She Fell in Love" – 2:21
An alternate title for "Du Og Meg", based on the first line of the song.
"Voltaic Crusher" – 2:04

Bonus tracks on double vinyl release
The double vinyl release of the album contains the twelve tracks on the first three sides. The fourth side contains four bonus tracks, which can also be found on the EP Icons, Abstract Thee.
 "Du Og Meg" – 2:21
 "Voltaic Crusher/Undrum to Muted Da" – 2:04
 "Derailments in a Place of Our Own" – 3:03
 "No Conclusion" – 9:42

Charts

Album

References

External links
 Pitchfork Media article

2007 albums
Of Montreal albums
Polyvinyl Record Co. albums
Concept albums